Sean Higgins is a Scottish footballer who plays as a striker for Rossvale, as well as the club's assistant manager.

Career

Ross County
Higgins started his career with Hamilton Academical where he played at youth level. Higgins then moved to Ross County in 2002 where he spent seven years at Victoria Park, where he played in 173 league matches and scored 47 league goals.

Dundee
In 2009 Higgins joined fellow First Division club Dundee where he spent just under five years, where he played in 52 league matches and scored 14 league goals. He would be a part of the "Deefiant" squad that overcame administration and a 25-point deduction to survive in 2010–11, a season that included a club record-breaking 23-game unbeaten streak. Higgins would play a key role in that run, particularly in a game against Queen of the South where he netted an equaliser in an eventual 2–1 win to notch Dundee's twentieth consecutive undefeated game, breaking the legendary 1962 team's record. During this game, Higgins wore a raw beefsteak in his boot to aid a freak injury, and would score his goal with the steak-filled boot.

St Johnstone
In May 2011 Higgins signed for St Johnstone for the 2011–12 season, where he played in six league matches without scoring any goals. Higgins was loaned out to Ayr United during the season, where he played in one league match without scoring any goals.

Falkirk
Higgins joined Falkirk on transfer deadline day in August 2012. After an up and down campaign, Higgins left the club at the end of the 2012–13 season, having played in 25 league matches and scoring four league goals.

Stenhousemuir
Higgins signed for Stenhousemuir in the summer of 2013. He was a main stay in the Stenny team, as they narrowly missed out on a play-off spot at the end of the season. Higgins will perhaps be remembered for scoring a double, including an equalising penalty, in a 3–3 draw against Rangers at Ibrox Stadium on 22 February 2014.
He finished the campaign having played 30 league matches for Stenhousmuir, tallying up nine goals.

Cowdenbeath
After leaving Stenhousemuir at the end of the season, on 30 May 2014, it was confirmed that Higgins had agreed terms with Scottish Championship outfit Cowdenbeath for the 2014–15 season. He scored seven goals in 37 games for the Blue Brazil.

Clyde
On 20 May 2015, Higgins agreed to sign for Clyde on a one-year deal. On 29 August 2015 Higgins scored a double against East Stirlingshire in a 3–1 win at Broadwood. After two seasons with Clyde, Higgins was released by the club in May 2017.

Albion Rovers
Shortly after leaving Clyde, Higgins signed for Scottish League One club Albion Rovers on 2 June 2017.

Clydebank & Rossvale
In June 2018, Sean signed for club Clydebank as player/coach. In 2019, Higgins joined Rossvale as a player and assistant manager.

Honours 
Dundee
Scottish Challenge Cup: 2009–10

References

External links

1984 births
Living people
Footballers from Glasgow
Scottish footballers
Scottish Football League players
Dundee F.C. players
Ross County F.C. players
St Johnstone F.C. players
Falkirk F.C. players
Stenhousemuir F.C. players
Cowdenbeath F.C. players
Clyde F.C. players
Albion Rovers F.C. players
Association football forwards
Scottish Junior Football Association players